Darvishan, Iran may refer to:
 Darvishan, Bushehr
 Darvishan, Fars
 Darvishan, Kermanshah
 Darvishan, Khuzestan
 Darvishan-e Yek, Khuzestan Province
 Darvishan, Divandarreh, Kurdistan Province
 Darvishan, Sanandaj, Kurdistan Province
 Darvishan, Markazi
 Darvishan, Mazandaran
 Darvishan, West Azerbaijan
 Darvishan Sarbisheh